Tsend-Ochiryn Tsogtbaatar (born 16 March 1996) is a Mongolian judoka.

He competed at the 2020 Summer Olympics in Tokyo, in the men's 73 kg and won the Bronze Medal. Prior to the Olympics, he fought the World Junior Championship in 2014 and 2015. He won a bronze medal at the World Cadet Championships in 2013. In 2015, he reached the final of the Abu Dhabi Grand Slam.

At the 2021 Judo Grand Slam Abu Dhabi held in Abu Dhabi, United Arab Emirates, he won the gold medal in his event. He won one of the bronze medals in his event at the 2022 Judo Grand Slam Paris held in Paris, France.

References

External links
 

1996 births
Living people
Mongolian male judoka
Olympic judoka of Mongolia
Judoka at the 2016 Summer Olympics
Judoka at the 2014 Summer Youth Olympics
Judoka at the 2018 Asian Games
Asian Games competitors for Mongolia
Judoka at the 2020 Summer Olympics
Medalists at the 2020 Summer Olympics
Olympic medalists in judo
Olympic bronze medalists for Mongolia
Sportspeople from Ulaanbaatar
20th-century Mongolian people
21st-century Mongolian people